FBC Mortgage Stadium (formerly known as Bright House Networks Stadium and Spectrum Stadium, also known as the Bounce House) is an American football stadium located in Orlando, Florida, United States, on the main campus of the University of Central Florida. It is the home field of the UCF Knights of NCAA Division I FBS college football.

The stadium opened in 2007 as a replacement for Camping World Stadium (then known as the Citrus Bowl) in Downtown Orlando, where the Knights had played since their inaugural season in 1979. The steel and brick-clad stadium was designed by 360 Architecture and constructed in 18 months. The stadium was designed for 48,000 capacity when it opened in 2007 and is designed for a expansion to 65,000 seats. The stadium underwent an $8 million renovation following the 2014 season. The Wayne Densch Center for Student-Athlete Leadership was built on the east facade of the stadium, and a party deck was added to the east stands. Since the renovations, its seating capacity is 45,301. The attendance record as of the 2019 season was 48,453 for an October 18, 2009 match-up against the Miami Hurricanes. The stadium was home of the now defunct Orlando Apollos during the first and only 2019 season of the Alliance of American Football.

The facility has a longtime nickname of The Bounce House, as it was found to be susceptible to considerable shaking when its crowd jumps in unison. Although it was stated that the stadium was structurally sound and that this effect would not cause long-term damage to the facility, measures were undertaken following the stadium's inaugural season to reduce these effects.

On May 31, 2022, FBC Mortgage entered a 10-year, $19.5 million deal with UCF for the naming rights of the stadium beginning July 1, 2022.

Location
The stadium's 50-yard-line is lined up with Launch Pad 39A, to symbolize UCF's longstanding partnership with NASA and other space agencies. The stadium is also a part of the Kenneth G. Dixon Athletics Village and is bordered by McCulloch Road on the north side, Knights Plaza on the west side, and Orion Boulevard on the southern and eastern sides.

To the west in Knights Plaza is the Addition Financial Arena, The Venue, John Euliano Park, and the UCF Track and Soccer Complex. Also located in Knights Plaza are The Towers residence halls, housing 2,000 UCF students, including student-athletes.

History
From 1979 to 2006, the Knights played their home games at the Citrus Bowl in downtown Orlando. By the 2000s, the stadium had fallen into a dilapidated state. School officials were dissatisfied with the condition of the facility and lack of revenue generated from games. The stadium's capacity (65,000) was considered too large for the Knights, and the location off-campus was considered a significant factor in the inability to sustain a sizeable student section. When the university approached the city about renovations and new revenue-sharing measures, they were met with resistance. While the city had expressed interest in renovating the Citrus Bowl with or without UCF's support, funding was seriously in doubt. The city was in the planning stages for a new arena, new performing arts center, and "creative village", with stadium renovations seemingly taking less priority.

In early 2005, the university abandoned the efforts to renovate the Citrus Bowl, and conducted a feasibility study to construct an on-campus stadium. Along with playing in a modern facility, and generating revenue, additional motivations included drawing more students to the games, a more intimate setting, and establishing game-day traditions on campus. With UCF's main campus one of the largest in the nation, building an on-campus stadium was also seen as a way to grow the university. In December 2005, the UCF Board of Trustees approved the construction of the new on-campus stadium. The facility, initially known as UCF Stadium, was hoped to be ready for the 2006 season. However, construction was delayed due to concerns from local residents regarding potentially falling property values and noise levels from the stadium.

Construction broke ground on March 22, 2006. Two months later, it was announced that the Texas Longhorns would be the first opponent for the UCF Knights in the new stadium. The game, the first of three scheduled meetings between the schools, was held September 15, 2007. A sellout crowd of 45,622 saw the Knights put a scare into the Longhorns before falling, 35–32.

Naming rights

During construction, the stadium's naming rights were sold to cable provider Bright House Networks, naming the facility Bright House Networks Stadium. In 2016, Bright House Networks was acquired by Charter Communications; in accordance with the company's use of Spectrum as a trade name for its cable services, the facility was renamed Spectrum Stadium in April 2017. This naming rights deal ended in 2020.

UCF next attempted to secure a new naming rights deal with RoofClaim.com, a roofing services company. In early 2020, a proposed 15-year, $35-million naming rights deal was drafted, but never finalized. The Florida Legislature put itself in position to hold approval authority for such sponsorships valued at over $1 million. Political pressure terminated a similar naming rights deal the company had briefly secured with Florida Atlantic University for that school's basketball arena.

Anticipating being unable to secure a stadium naming rights deal, UCF Athletics announced on August 5, 2020, that the stadium would officially be named the "Bounce House" for the 2020 football season. Entering the 2021 football season, the stadium was still officially known by that name, while a potential naming rights deal with 3MG Roofing seemingly fell through. A deal was struck between UCF and FBC Mortgage on May 31, 2022, renaming the stadium to FBC Mortgage Stadium with a 10-year, $19.5 million contract.

Nickname
The stadium's nickname is the "Bounce House". The stadium vibrates and shakes when fans jump in unison, most notably when the song "Kernkraft 400" by Zombie Nation is played. The bouncing effect was noticed early on, and shortly after the stadium opened in 2007, some people started calling the facility "The Trampoline", a nickname that ultimately failed to gain traction. The more trendy nickname "Bounce House" soon became popular, very loosely derived from "Bright House [Networks Stadium]" (the official name at the time). For a brief time in 2020–2021, the stadium was officially named Bounce House, while the university was negotiating a new naming rights deal.

While many fans like the bouncing effect, some are uneasy with the bouncing. Stadium officials claimed the stadium was structurally sound, and an independent contractor confirmed that the bouncing would neither damage the stadium nor shorten its expected 50–year useful life. Still, a project was undertaken prior to the 2008 season to reinforce the stadium superstructure and mitigate the bouncing effect.

While the bouncing has been greatly reduced by the stadium reinforcements, it is still noticeable—sometimes enough to shake television cameras during games. For the 2010 Conference USA Football Championship Game, ESPN set up a camera position outside of the stadium to eliminate camera bounce caused by fans.

Drinking fountain controversy
The stadium was originally built without drinking fountains. The university argued that the building code used when the stadium was designed and approved did not require the installation of drinking fountains. However, this claim turned out to be incorrect because the 2004 Florida building code (in effect in 2005, when the UCF Board of Trustees approved the stadium design) mandated that stadiums and other public arenas must have one water fountain for every 1,000 seats, or half that number of fountains if water was also available for sale.

During the inaugural game against Texas, vendors ran out of water at halftime, leading to the hospitalization of 18 people for heat exhaustion. In order to correct the issue, UCF provided a free bottle of water to each person at the next game and immediately began work to install at least 50 drinking fountains throughout the stadium in order to comply with the 2004 building code requirement.

Renovations

The stadium was designed for a planned expansion to 65,000 seats. UCF planned to begin this effort by expanding the Roth Tower with more suites and club seating, and also adding an additional 10,000 seats in a third level on the east side of the stadium, increasing the stadium's capacity to 56,000.

The capacity for the 2015 season dropped by 1,117 seats when UCF removed seats on the east sidelines to construct the "Carl Black and Gold Cabana," which includes a bar, catered barbecue, and padded seats above the bar. In 2017, private field-level cabanas were erected in the south endzone, adjacent to the new J. & J. Rosengren Lounge. In 2018, additional field-level cabanas were added to the north endzone, as well as Loge cabana tables along the top rim of the grandstands.

In 2017, the university sued the architects and contractors that designed and constructed the stadium. Cited in the lawsuit were claims of "defects and deficiencies" which ostensibly led to "premature wear of the steel," as well as visible rust issues.

2018–present

At their spring game in 2018, UCF unveiled signage on Roth Tower to commemorate the football program's conference championships, New Year's Six/BCS bowl wins, and their National Championship for the 2017 season.

The short-lived Alliance of American Football (AAF) included the Orlando Apollos as one of its franchises with the Apollos playing at Spectrum Stadium during its inaugural 2019 season.  The AAF folded in April 2019 with its first season incomplete; the University of Central Florida had failed to invoice the AAF for the lease of its stadium facilities or expenses for staff, leading media to speculate that UCF had lost more than $1 million of revenue from the deal.

Just over two weeks before the 2019 UCF football season opener, the UCF athletic department announced that the entire season-ticket allotment was sold out for the first time in school history. In addition, they created a formal waiting list for season tickets, also for the first time. In the press release, then-UCF athletic director Danny White teased a possible expansion of the stadium in the near future if ticket demand remains high.

The stadium hosted the January 2022 edition of the Hula Bowl, due to Aloha Stadium near Honolulu being closed for renovations.

Through the 2022 season, UCF has compiled an overall record at the stadium of 78–24–0, including 4–0 in conference championship games. Since 2014, UCF has completed five seasons undefeated at home at the stadium. During the first few years of the stadium's use, under then-head coach George O'Leary, the Knights frequently wore gold home jerseys, with gold field markings prominent. This despite the team changing its nickname in 2007 from "Golden Knights" (1993–2006) back to simply "Knights" (1979–1992) as they moved into the new stadium. After O'Leary's departure, the Knights have largely eschewed gold jerseys in favor of various combinations of black and white home jerseys, with occasional gold accents.

Attendance records

The highest attendance for games played at FBC Mortgage Stadium against the Knights have included rival South Florida, Cincinnati, and Miami. The Knights largest home crowd at FBC Mortgage Stadium occurred in stadium's third season (2009) against in-state foe Miami (48,543). That is in contrast with UCF's largest all-time home crowd (51,978), which occurred at the 2005 C-USA Championship, when the team was still playing downtown at the Citrus Bowl, and UCF's largest-ever game crowd (109,295) at Michigan in 2016. The smallest crowd (8,874) came in 2020 against Tulsa, during COVID-19 restrictions.

Postseason games

Space Game
Since 2017, the UCF Knights have traditionally set aside one home game at FBC Mortgage Stadium to celebrate the university's ties to NASA and the nearby Kennedy Space Center. Dubbed the "Space Game", players wear special uniforms and helmets with space-themed designs and logos. Uniforms may include a replica mission patch, constellations, names of astronauts, and other images and graphics related to space exploration.

The 2018 Space Game marked the first appearance of the Citronaut logo on UCF's football uniform. The Citronaut was the university's first sports mascot when the school was known as Florida Technological University (FTU). Just hours before the 2020 Space Game, a SpaceX Falcon 9 rocket launch took place, which was visible from the stadium. The 2022 Space Game was also the milestone 100th UCF home game played at FBC Mortgage Stadium.

Through 2022, the Knights are 6–0 in the "Space Game". On multiple occasions, UCF's space-themed uniforms/helmets have been voted and recognized as among the best in all of college football.

See also

Greater Orlando
History of the University of Central Florida
List of NCAA Division I FBS football stadiums

Notes

References

External links

 

College football venues
UCF Knights football
Sports venues in Orlando, Florida
American football venues in Florida
Sports venues completed in 2007
2007 establishments in Florida
Soccer venues in Florida
Orlando Apollos